Janet Ackland (1938–2019) was a Welsh international lawn and indoor bowler.

Bowls career

World Championships
Ackland won two bronze medals and a silver medal at the 1977 World Outdoor Bowls Championship; the silver medals came in the pairs with Lilian Nicholas and the fours with Joan Osborne, Enid Morgan and Margaret Pomeroy, the silver medal was in the team event (Taylor Trophy).

Eleven years later the pinnacle of her long career came when she took the singles gold medal at the 1988 World Outdoor Bowls Championship in Auckland.

Commonwealth Games
Ackland competed at four successive Commonwealth Games and in the 1994 Commonwealth Games she won a bronze in the pairs with Ann Dainton.

National
Ackland began bowling in 1959 and won her first title at Llandrindod Wells in 1969 and was the 1980 and 1987 Welsh National Bowls Championships singles champion. She has been a member of the Welsh International bowling team since 1973, winning 100 indoor and outdoor caps. She was also the captain of her country's team.

Awards
Ackland is a member of the Welsh Sports Hall of Fame.

References

Sources 
Ffaith
Welsh Sports Hall of Fame Inductees, Bowls

Welsh female bowls players
Commonwealth Games bronze medallists for Wales
Bowls players at the 1982 Commonwealth Games
Bowls players at the 1986 Commonwealth Games
Bowls players at the 1990 Commonwealth Games
Bowls players at the 1994 Commonwealth Games
1938 births
2019 deaths
Bowls World Champions
Commonwealth Games medallists in lawn bowls
Medallists at the 1994 Commonwealth Games